Paul Avron Jeffreys (13 February 1952 – 21 December 1988) was an English rock musician. He played bass guitar in Cockney Rebel between 1972 and 1974, working on the group's first two albums, and later worked with a number of British bands, including Be-Bop Deluxe (1974), Warm Jets (1977–1980) and Electric Eels (1980–1981).

Death
He died, along with his wife Rachel Jeffreys (née Jones), at the age of 36. The couple were on Pan Am Flight 103 on the way to their honeymoon when the aircraft exploded, the remains falling over the town of Lockerbie.

References

External links

Paul Avron Jeffreys 13th Feb 1952 - 21st Dec 1988: website in the memory of Paul Jeffreys

English rock bass guitarists
Male bass guitarists
1952 births
1988 deaths
20th-century British male musicians
Pan Am Flight 103 victims
20th-century English musicians
20th-century bass guitarists
Protopunk musicians
English terrorism victims
Be-Bop Deluxe members
Steve Harley & Cockney Rebel members
Deaths by explosive device